The Grand Butler of France was one of the great offices of state in France, existing between the Middle Ages and the Revolution of 1789. Originally responsible for the maintenance of the Royal vineyards, and provisioning the court with wine, the Grand Butler's role became less and less important and more ceremonial over time.

List of Grand Butlers of France

 Hervé de Montmorency : circa 1080
 Louis de Senlis : before 1128
 Guillaume de Senlis : 1129–1147
 Guy III de Senlis : 1147
 Guy IV de Senlis : 1223
 Robert de Courtenay : took the cross during the Barons' Crusade of 1239–1241
 Étienne de Sancerre : before 1248
 John II of Brienne : before 1258
 Guy de Châtillon : 25 May 1296
 Henri IV de Sully : April 1317 captured by the Scots at the Battle of Old Byland
 Miles des Noyers : before 1336 – after 1346
 Jean de Chalon : before 1350–1361
 Jean de Sarrebruche : circa 1370
 Enguerrand VII, Lord of Coucy : circa 1384
 Guy Damas, seigneur de Cousan et de la Perrière : 15 May 1385 
 Louis de Gyac : 1386–1389
 Jacques de Bourbon: 26 July 1397
 Charles de Sav|oisy : 1409–1413
 Guillaume IV de Melun : 29 April 1402 – 21 July 1410
 Pierre des Essarts : 21 July 1410
 Waléran de Luxembourg, comte de Saint-Pol : 29 October 1410 – 9 February 1412
 Jean de Croy : 9 February 1412
 Robert de Bar : sworn in 6 October 1413 despite opposition from Jean de Croy who had previously held the office.
 Jean de Craon : 1413
 Jean d'Estouteville : 10 November 1415 
 Jean de Neufchatel : 30 July 1418
 Jacques de Dinan : in office 1427
 Jean de Rosnivinen : in office 1442
 Guillaume de Rosnivinen : 16 January 1446 
 Louis d'Estouteville : in office 1443
 Antoine de Châteauneuf : circa 1464
 Jean du Fou : in office 1470
 Charles de Rohan : in office until 1516
 François Baraton : in office until 1519
 Adrien de Hangest : in office until 1532
 Louis IV de Bueil, Comte de Sancerre : in office 1533
 Jean VII de Büeil, d.1638
 Jean de Büeil, comte de Marans, d.1665
 Pierre de Perrien, marquis de Crenan, d.1670  
 Louis de Beaupoil, marquis de Lanmary, d.1702
 Marc Antoine de Beaupoil, son fils : in office until 1731
 André de Gironde, comte de Buron : 28 mai 1731

References

Court titles in the Ancien Régime